The Triumph 20TS was a prototype sports car shown by Standard-Triumph in October 1952 at the London Motor Show. Extensive development of the 20TS led to the introduction of the Triumph TR2 in March 1953 at the Geneva Motor Show, after which the 20TS was unofficially referred to as the Triumph TR1. Only one example of this car was ever made by Triumph.

Concept and design
The 20TS was built using existing components: its engine came from the Standard Vanguard, its suspension from the Triumph Mayflower, and its chassis from the Standard 8 hp, itself based on the pre-war Standard Flying Nine. The body was designed to be built economically, with no panels requiring double-action presswork.  Economy of design was considered vital, as the company did not expect high sales figures and had targeted a price of £500 before sales tax. The rear of the car was short and curved and had the spare tyre bolted to it.

Earls Court, Ken Richardson, and the TR2
The 20TS was shown to the public in October 1952 at the London Motor Show at Earls Court. Reactions to the 20TS were mixed.  Criticisms included a tight interior and lack of boot space.

To get an opinion of the car's performance and handling at speed, Standard-Triumph chairman Sir John Black invited BRM development engineer and test driver Ken Richardson to drive it.

Upon hearing Richardson's assessment, Black asked him to help redesign the car. Richardson tuned and modified the engine and worked with Triumph engineers to increase the brake size, modify the front suspension, and experiment with rear springs and shocks. A stronger frame with improved torsional rigidity was designed.  Meanwhile, the stylists widened and lengthened the car for more interior room and boot space, mounting the spare wheel inside the boot.  The result was the Triumph TR2, introduced in March 1953 at the Geneva Motor Show.

Legacy
The 20TS was the origin of the Triumph TR sports car line, and was referred to unofficially as the TR1 after the introduction of the TR2.

It is unknown whether the 20TS exists today. According to Bill Piggott, the car might have been scrapped to provide parts for a TR2 prototype.

References

Further reading

TR1
1950s cars
Roadsters
Rear-wheel-drive vehicles